Mashi, in Iran, may refer to:
 Mashi, Kerman
 Mashi, Khuzestan
 Mashi, Sistan and Baluchestan